The Ease Gill Cave System is the longest, and most complex cave system in Britain as of 2011, with around  of passages, including connections only passable by cave diving. It spans the valley between Leck Fell and Casterton Fell.  The water resurges into Leck Beck.

The first-discovered entrance, Lancaster Hole, was found by George Cornes and Bill Taylor on 29 September 1946. A small draughting opening on Casterton Fell, Cumbria, opened immediately onto a  shaft. Passages from the base of the shaft were explored over the succeeding weeks and months by members of the British Speleological Association, including Jim Eyre. The underground course of the Ease Gill (the local master cave) and high-level fossil passages above it were found and followed upstream to a series of complex inlet passages. In succeeding years, these have been connected to surface caves, including Top Sinks, County Pot and Pool Sink.

The cave passages adjoining the Ease Gill main streamway were connected to Link Pot and Pippikin Pot in 1978, and Pippikin was itself connected to Lost John's Cave by diving in 1989.

With its many entrances, the Ease Gill system offers cavers a wide variety of through trips; the Ease Gill streamway is regarded as one of the finest in the UK.

Entrances 
Entrances include:
 Top Sink
 Pool Sink
 The Borehole
 Slit Sinks
 Wretched Rabbit
 Corner Sink
 County Pot
 Cow Dubs II
 Cow Pot
 Lancaster Hole
 Link Pot
 Mistral Hole
 Pippikin Pot
 Bull Pot of the Witches

References

Bibliography

External links 
 Website that contains a description of much of the Ease Gill system
 Website that includes details of several caving routes in the Ease Gill System

Limestone caves
Wild caves
Caves of Cumbria
Caves of Lancashire
Caves of the Three Counties System